NBA League Pass is the National Basketball Association's direct-to-consumer subscription-based product that gives basketball fans access to NBA games, live and on-demand, for the entire NBA season.  League Pass is available to viewers in the United States and as an international package for all other countries. The pricing structure and services on offer are different, depending on where the viewer is located. A 7-day free trial is available for new subscribers everywhere.

United States League Pass

NBA League Pass is an out-of-market sports package that allows its subscribers to watch up to 40 out-of-market National Basketball Association games a week. Videos of the games come from local stations and regional sports networks.

NBA League Pass is available on the web, iOS, Android, Android TV, Apple TV, Xbox One and Xbox Series X (select countries), Roku (select countries), PlayStation 5 (select countries), Chromecast, Amazon Fire TV and Fire Stick, Comcast Xfinity Flex Platform, CarPlay, and Apple Watch.

Customers outside the United States can sign up for NBA International League Pass.

Your NBA League Pass subscription includes:

Live and on-demand games
Restricted locations apply. For fans accessing from the US and Canada, all games that are not restricted by US and Canadian Blackouts will be available for viewing
Access to NBA TV's 24-hour stream and show archives with exclusive features, interviews, press conferences, and live events. See here for country restrictions
Access to full game archives starting from the 2012–2013 season to the present
Every feed - Home, Away, Mobile View, plus additional languages and camera angles

Blackout restrictions

If a local team is playing and the game is televised in the home market, the associated feed on League Pass is blacked out and unavailable for viewing.

Per the NBA.com website: 
“Games will also be blacked out when they are appearing on national television. This applies to games being televised on ABC, ESPN, TNT and NBA TV. You may view these games simply by switching to the designated channel.”

In Canada, Bulls games on WGN-TV are not blacked out.

NBA League Pass availability in the US
NBA League Pass TV is available with these cable, satellite and streaming providers in the United States:

 United States:
 AT&T U-verse
 DIRECTV
 Dish Network
 fuboTV
 iN DEMAND Team
 Adams Cable
 Blue Ridge Communications
 Altice
 Comcast (Xfinity)
 Cox Communications
 Frontier Communications
 RCN
 Charter Communications (Spectrum)
 Verizon FiOS
 Sling TV
 YouTube TV
 B/R Live
 Yahoo Sports (Only on mobile and tablet devices)

Most providers who offer subscriptions to League Pass TV also include NBA TV and a companion League Pass Broadband subscription. It is also included in some cable subscriptions.

NBA International League Pass

NBA International League Pass is available to users living outside the United States, and differs from the US version of the product in its content, packaging, and pricing. While both the US and international products feature games available for live or on-demand viewing, the major distinction between the two products is that International League Pass provides access to all NBA games played during the regular season, All Star Weekend, Playoffs, and Finals, free from blackout restrictions. The single exception to this offering is in Canada, where games televised nationally are blacked out live and are available for on-demand viewing only after the game is completed. International League Pass also provides access to games from previous seasons through archives.

International users have the option of subscribing to several package options, varying by region: NBA League Pass, League Pass Premium, Team Choice, Game Choice, and 3-Game Choice. Subscribers to all packages are able to watch NBA games from Summer League, preseason, regular season, All Star Weekend, Playoffs, and Finals live or on-demand from a variety of devices, including desktop computers, iPhones, iPads, Android phones and tablets, and TV-connected devices like Apple TV, Android TV, Google Chromecast, Xbox and PlayStation consoles (the platforms supported differ by country). Subscribers are also able to use in-game features including multi-game viewing, stats windows, and a condensed game feature that only includes scoring and highlight plays. Additional features, such as access to NBA TV and multi-device streaming, vary by subscription.

Beginning in the 2014–15 season, NBA International League Pass introduced continuous game feeds for selected games and all home feeds, which replaced the game break videos (highlights, commercials, etc.) shown during play breaks with highlight clips, live footage of in-arena activities including dance team performances, half-time entertainment, fans in the crowd, and interviews or features produced by the local broadcaster.

International Packages and Promotions

In addition to the standard and Premium packages, users also have the option to purchase a stand-alone streaming subscription to NBA TV International, which broadcasts games, studio shows, press conferences, and other basketball content. In past seasons, International League Pass has also offered sampling packages that provide stand-alone access to Christmas Day games and All Star Weekend events. The last several weeks of the regular season have also been made available in a separate "Race to the Playoffs" package.

During the off-season, both International League Pass and International League Pass Premium subscribers have live and on-demand access to Summer League games and certain games or scrimmages played by the USA Basketball team in preparation for or during the Olympics and the FIBA World Cup tournament, in addition to continued access to past NBA regular seasons in archives. This summer content has also been sold as a stand-alone package.

International League Pass offers a rolling free trial of the product throughout the season, allowing first time users to preview the League Pass experience before purchasing.

NBA League Pass availability outside the US

Note: Subscriptions can be bought in most regions via the Internet to be streamed to applications on various devices or to a browser (see above for list). Some of the following services include League Pass, either fully or partially, but they are not required to view League Pass.
 
Brazil
Vivo TV
 Canada:
 Bell Satellite TV
 Shaw Direct
 Cogeco Cable
 EastLink Cable
 Rogers Cable
Japan
Rakuten
Mexico and Central America:
 SKY México
Philippines:
 Cablelink, Globe, Sky Cable, and PLDT/Smart 
South America and Caribbean (except Brazil):
 DirecTV
United Kingdom:
 Sky Sports
Vietnam:
 VTV Cab

Applications, Features and Platforms supported

Apps are currently available for:

 Smart TVs (depends on manufacturer/model)
 Apple TV
 Xbox 360
 Xbox One
 Xbox Series X/S
 Android devices
 iOS devices
 Windows Phone
 Roku
 Amazon Kindle Fire
 PlayStation 4
 PlayStation 5
 Amazon Fire TV
 Chromecast
 Android TV

For the 2013–14 season, League Pass's apps were updated with the ability to select home and away feeds on all games, and video-on-demand access for games broadcast nationally.

For the 2016–17 season, a new feature known as "Mobile View" was introduced, which allows viewers to access a special feed of the home telecast with optimizations for viewing on smartphones. The Mobile View feed will utilize a new dedicated camera angle with a tighter, zoomed-in shot of gameplay. The league will provide a camera and a producer for the feature at each regular-season game, who will have access to the special camera and all others in use for the production.

WNBA League Pass

In 2016, the WNBA launched WNBA League Pass which featured live out-of-market games. The service includes a full-season, one-team, and single-game package. Nationally televised games are only available as archives, and are not available live on the service.

As of 2023, Athletes Unlimited Basketball games are also available on the platform.

Summer League Pass

The 2013 NBA Summer League was available as a streaming subscription service with an app' for IOS and Android devices in the 2013 off-season. Priced at $14.99, all 61 games in both the Orlando Pro Summer League and the Las Vegas League were included in the price. Summer League is now included as part of the standard League Pass offering internationally.

See also
 NFL Sunday Ticket
 MLS Direct Kick
 MLB Extra Innings
 NHL Center Ice
 NASCAR Hot Pass
National Basketball Association criticisms and controversies

References

External links
Official site

Satellite television
National Basketball Association on television
Out-of-market sports packages
Television channels and stations established in 1995
PlayStation 4 software